Corendon Dutch Airlines is a Dutch charter and scheduled airline headquartered in Badhoevedorp, Haarlemmermeer. It is a sister company of Corendon Airlines and Corendon Airlines Europe.

History
Corendon Dutch Airlines is the Dutch branch of the Corendon Group which started operations under its own AOC in April 2011 using a single Boeing 737-800 aircraft serving European holiday destinations from Amsterdam Airport Schiphol and Maastricht Aachen Airport.

Destinations

America
Brazil
Natal - Gov. Aluízio Alves International Airport (suspended)

Africa
Cape Verde
Sal - Amílcar Cabral International Airport (suspended)
Egypt
Hurghada – Hurghada International Airport
The Gambia
Banjul – Banjul International Airport

Europe
Bulgaria
Burgas – Burgas Airport

Greece
Heraklion – Heraklion International Airport
Kos – Kos Island International Airport
Rhodes – Diagoras International Airport
Mytilini – Mytilene International Airport
North-Macedonia
Ohrid – Ohrid Airport (suspended)
Netherlands
Amsterdam - Amsterdam Schiphol Airport 
Maastricht - Maastricht Aachen Airport
Portugal
Faro – Faro Airport (suspended)
Funchal – Madeira Airport (suspended)
Spain
Fuerteventura - Fuerteventura Airport (suspended)
Gran Canaria - Gran Canaria Airport
Lanzarote - Lanzarote Airport (suspended)
Tenerife - Tenerife South Airport (suspended)
Ibiza - Ibiza Airport
Palma de Mallorca - Palma de Mallorca Airport
Malaga - Malaga Costa del Sol Airport (suspended)
Turkey
Antalya – Antalya Airport
Bodrum - Milas–Bodrum Airport
Dalaman - Dalaman Airport
Gazipaşa - Gazipaşa-Alanya Airport (begins 23 April 2023)
Izmir - Izmir Airport
 Italy
Trapani - Birgi Airport
Alghero - Fertilia Airport

Fleet

The Corendon Dutch Airlines fleet consists of the following aircraft as of January 2023:

References

External links

 Corendon Dutch Airlines

Airlines of the Netherlands
Airlines established in 2010
Dutch companies established in 2010
Companies based in North Holland
Charter airlines
Haarlemmermeer